Keratin 83, also known as KRT83, is a protein which humans is encoded by the KRT83  gene.

Function 
The protein encoded by this gene is a member of the keratin gene family. As a type II hair keratin, it is a basic protein which heterodimerizes with type I keratins to form hair and nails. The type II hair keratins are clustered in a region of chromosome 12q13 and are grouped into two distinct subfamilies based on structure similarity. One subfamily, consisting of KRTHB1 (KRT81), KRTHB3 (KRT83, this protein), and KRTHB6 (KRT86), is highly related. The other less-related subfamily includes KRTHB2 (KRT82), KRTHB4 (KRT84), and KRTHB5 (KRT85). All hair keratins are expressed in the hair follicle; this hair keratin, as well as KRTHB1 and KRTHB6, is found primarily in the hair cortex.

Clinical significance 

Mutations in the KRT83 gene have been associated with monilethrix.

References

Further reading